Ronald Wayne Copeland Sr. (October 3, 1946 – May 22, 1975) was an American hurdler, sprinter, and American football wide receiver. He played in the National Football League (NFL) for the Chicago Bears in 1969.

References 

 Profile at trackfield.brinkster.net

1946 births
1975 deaths
American male hurdlers
Athletes (track and field) at the 1967 Pan American Games
Pan American Games gold medalists for the United States
Pan American Games medalists in athletics (track and field)
Universiade medalists in athletics (track and field)
Universiade silver medalists for the United States
American football wide receivers
UCLA Bruins football players
Chicago Bears players
Track and field athletes from Los Angeles
Players of American football from Los Angeles
Medalists at the 1967 Summer Universiade
Medalists at the 1967 Pan American Games